Gablin  is a village in the administrative district of Gmina Dominowo, within Środa Wielkopolska County, Greater Poland Voivodeship, in west-central Poland.

One of Hungary's biggest car dealership's owner, Gábor Gablini presumably has ancestors from this village.

References

Gablin